otai is a drink which originated in western Polynesia and is usually made as a refreshing accompaniment to large meals.

Today, the beverage is most associated with Tongan cuisine, although similar versions of 'otai were made and enjoyed in other archipelagoes, including Uvea, Samoa, Futuna, Tokelau, Tuvalu, and Niue. The original Samoan version as recorded by European colonists in the 1890s was made by mixing grated ambarella fruit (called vi in Samoan language and Tongan, wi in Hawaiian language) and young coconut meat with coconut milk and coconut water. The mixture was poured into large, empty coconut shells corked with coconut husk and allowed to chill in cold pools of water (or behind waterfalls) before serving.

The modern Tongan recipe most well-known today is usually a blend of water, shredded coconut meat, and any variety of grated tropical fruits, most commonly watermelon, mango and pineapple, with watermelon being the most used in the Tongan Islands.  Sugar is usually added to taste. Tongan historians have noted this version is a very modern take on the traditional Polynesian otai, especially since milk, refined sugar, watermelons, mangos, and pineapples are all introduced, foreign ingredients that were not native to Tonga. The original Tongan recipe was said to be identical to the Samoan recipe, except the preferred native fruit was not ambarella (vi), but the Tongan mountain apple, called fekika. In Samoa, this distinction of "native" and "introduced" recipes is differentiated as "otai" only refers to the drink prepared with vi fruit, while the otai made with European-introduced fruits are respectively called vai meleni (watermelon drink), vai mago (mango drink), or vai fala (pineapple drink).

See also
 List of juices

References

Tongan cuisine
Samoan cuisine
Wallis and Futuna cuisine
Niuean cuisine
Tuvaluan cuisine
Tokelauan cuisine
Fruit juice
Oceanian cuisine
Polynesian drinks
Foods containing coconut